Longworth station is on the Canadian National Railway mainline in Longworth, British Columbia. Via Rail's Jasper–Prince Rupert train calls at the station as a flag stop.

Footnotes

External links 
Via Rail Station Description

Via Rail stations in British Columbia